A number of ships Royal Navy have been named HMS Echo, after the Echo of Greek mythology

 was a 24-gun sixth rate captured from France in 1758 and sold in 1770.
 was the French Cerf-class brig-rigged cutter Hussard, of eighteen 6-pounder guns, launched in 1779 or '80 and captured on 7 July 1780
 was a 16-gun sloop launched in 1782 and broken up in 1797.
 was a 16-gun sloop launched in 1797 and sold in 1809. She then became a whaler before she was wrecked in 1821  
 was an 18-gun  launched in 1809 and broken up in 1817.
 was a wooden paddle vessel launched in 1827, converted to a tugboat in 1830, and sold in 1885.
 was an E-class destroyer launched in 1934 and on loan to the Greek Navy from 1944 to 1956, then broken up.
 was an  survey vessel launched in 1957 and sold in 1986.
 is an  hydrographic survey ship, launched in 2002 and decommissioned in June 2022

Other ships 

In addition to these ships, a number of vessels have been taken up from trade and named Echo while in government service:

Echo was a dockyard tank vessel previously named Luda. She was purchased in 1887 and sold in 1928.
Echo was a whaler, previously named Barrowby, built in 1912 at Oslo, and of 182 tons (BRT). She was purchased in January 1915 at Durban, South Africa, one of several purchased there and then. During her naval service she was armed with one 12-pounder gun and two 3-pounders, and served in East Africa, particularly in operations in the Rufiji River in 1915. The Admiralty sold her on 6 March 1919 back to her owners, Irvin & Johnson, who returned her name to Barrowby. 
Echo was a trawler launched in 1897, of 165 tons (BRT), and with Hull-reg H.367; she was hired between 1915 and 1921 and served as a boom defense vessel. 
Echo was a drifter, formerly a French minesweeper seized in 1940, renamed Resound later that year, and returned in 1946.

Battle honours
Ships named Echo have earned the following battle honours:

 Quebec 1759
 Martinique 1762
 Havana 1762
 Cape of Good Hope 1795
 Atlantic 1939
 Norway 1940
 Bismarck 1941
 Arctic 1941-43
 Malta Convoys 1942
 Sicily 1943
 Salerno 1943
 Aegean 1943

Royal Navy ship names